Two Inlets Lake is a lake in Becker County, Minnesota, in the United States.

Two Inlets Lake was named from two inflowing streams which meet at nearly the same point.

See also
List of lakes in Minnesota

References

Lakes of Minnesota
Lakes of Becker County, Minnesota